HMS Epervier was a French 16-gun Alcyon-class brig. HMS Egyptienne captured her in the Atlantic Ocean on 27 July 1803; she was taken into Royal Navy service under her existing name. Before being broken up in 1811 she captured several prizes and was present at the Battle of San Domingo. Her crew received a clasp to the Naval General Service Medal for their participation in that battle and another for an action in December 1808. She was laid up in late 1810 and was sold in 1811.

French origins and capture
Epervier was built between 1801 and 1802 by Enterprise Crucy Basse-Indre (near Nantes) to a design by François Gréhan. She was launched on 30 June 1802.

She was commissioned under Lieutenant de vaisseau Emmanuel Halgan. At some point Jérôme Bonaparte boarded her. On 31 August 1802 she sailed from Nantes for Martinique and Guadeloupe.

Captain Charles Fleeming (Fleming) and Egyptienne captured Epervier off the coast of France on 27 July 1803 as she was returning to Lorient from Guadeloupe. At the time she was armed with 16 guns and had a crew of 90 men.

British service
The British rearmed her, upgrading her battery substantially. Commander James Watson commissioned her in May 1804 and then in August Commander John Impey assumed command and sailed for Jamaica the next month.

On 15 January 1805, Epervier captured Sally.

Then eleven days later, Epervier was in the Leeward Islands, six miles from Crab Island. For five hours she chased a strange sail before she succeeded in capturing the French privateer schooner Elizabeth from Marie Galante. Elizabeth was armed with four carriage guns and small arms. One of her crew of 34 was killed during her "obstinate Attempt to escape." She had already taken a sloop from Tortola that she had sent into St. Thomas.

On 9 May Epervier and  captured Charles. Later that month, on 25 May Epervier captured the Spanish schooner Casualidad. She was taking a cargo of cocoa from Puerto Cabello to Old Spain.

Lieutenant James Higginson (acting) assumed command in January 1806. Epervier was too small to take part in the battle but she did share in the prize money. In 1847 Her crew also qualified for the Naval General Service Medal with clasp "St. Domingo".

On 11 May, while under Tucker's command, Epervier captured the brig Mildred.

Bowker re-assumed command and on 27 October was in command of Epevier when she captured the Danish galliot Active. However Bowken then had to return home in February 1808. His successor was again Tucker.

On 11 November, Epervier, and  captured Intrepid. Nine days later, Amaranthe, Circe, Epervier and Unique captured the American ships  and Mary and Allen. Prize money for Intrepid and Bonetta was paid in 1814, and 1839.

On 12 December Epervier joined the frigate Circe, the ship-sloop , the schooner , and the advice boat  in an action against the French 16-gun schooner Cygne and two schooners off the Pearl Rock, Saint-Pierre, Martinique. The British eventually succeeded in destroying Cygne, but suffered heavy casualties in the process. In all, the British lost some 12 men killed, 31 wounded, and 26 missing (drowned or prisoners) for little gain. Epervier suffered no losses. In 1847 the Admiralty authorized the award of the Naval General Service Medal with the clasp "Off The Pearl Rock 13 Decr. 1808" to the then living survivors of the battle.

Fate
Commanders Thomas Barclay and James P. Stewart, and possibly Lt. M. de Courcy (acting). commanded her briefly. On 4 September 1810 the Navy Office offered her for sale at Chatham Dockyard. Epervier was scrapped at Chatham in June 1811.

Notes

Citations

References
 
  
 

Brig-sloops of the Royal Navy
1802 ships
Ships built in France
Captured ships